Cheryl Marie Bartlett  is a Canadian biologist. She is a Professor Emerita of Biology and former Tier 1 Canada Research Chair in Integrative Science at the Department of Biology at Cape Breton University.

Early life
Barlett was born and raised in Duchess, Alberta and attended Augustana University College. In 1977, Barlett earned her Bachelor of Science in Zoology at the University of Alberta before moving to Guelph for her Master's degree and PhD.

Career
In 1989, Barlett accepted a placement at Cape Breton University in the biology department before moving to Toqwa’tu’kl Kjijitaqnn / Integrative Science. By 2002, she was appointed a Tier 1 Canada Research Chair (CRC) in Integrative Science. Barlett's research focused on the concept of Integrative Science, which is the practice of merging both Indigenous knowledge and Westernized Scientific Knowledge into one "Two-Eyed Seeing framework."

As a result of research with Aboriginal Knowledge, she was appointed a Member of the Order of Canada in 2011 before retiring.

References

Living people
Canadian biologists
Scientists from Alberta
University of Alberta alumni
University of Guelph alumni
Academic staff of Cape Breton University
Canada Research Chairs
Members of the Order of Canada
Year of birth missing (living people)